Clarence E. Clark (September 22, 1907 – September 27, 1974) was an American professional golfer.

Clark worked as a golf pro at McFarlin Golf Club (Tulsa, Oklahoma), Forest Hill Field Club (Bloomfield, New Jersey), Carey Park Golf Course (Hutchinson, Kansas), O'Brien's Golf Center (Wichita, Kansas), Newton Country Club (Newton, Kansas), and Dyess Air Force Base Golf Course and Lazee Tee Golf Center (Abilene, Texas). He also played on the PGA Tour, winning seven times in the 1930s, including the Texas Open and Houston Open on consecutive weeks in 1932. In 1936, he was tied for the lead in the U.S. Open after the first round and finished the tournament tied for third.

Clark died in Abilene, Texas in 1974.

Professional wins

PGA Tour wins (7)
1931 (2) Central Florida Open, New Jersey PGA Championship
1932 (2) Texas Open, Houston Open
1933 (1) New Jersey Open
1934 (1) Hazard Kentucky Open
1936 (1) Lake Placid Open

Other wins
1930 Oklahoma Open

Results in major championships

Note: Clark never played in The Open Championship.

NYF = tournament not yet founded
CUT = missed the half-way cut
"T" indicates a tie for a place
R64, R32, R16, QF, SF = round in which player lost in PGA Championship match play

References

American male golfers
PGA Tour golfers
Golfers from Kansas
Golfers from Oklahoma
Golfers from New Jersey
Golfers from Texas
People from Paola, Kansas
Sportspeople from Abilene, Texas
1907 births
1974 deaths